IP5 is a forum of the five largest intellectual property offices in the world. The five patent offices are the US Patent and Trademark Office (USPTO), the European Patent Office (EPO), the Japan Patent Office (JPO), the Korean Intellectual Property Office (KIPO), and the National Intellectual Property Administration (CNIPA formerly SIPO) in China. In 2015, the IP5 patent offices together granted about one million patents.

See also
Trilateral Patent Offices

References

External links
 IP5 website

Patent law organizations
Patent offices